Callixte Nzabonimana (born 1953) is a former Rwandan politician who is accused of participating in the Rwandan genocide.

Prior to 1994 

An ethnic Hutu from Gitarama prefecture, Nzabonimana held the position of Minister of Planning in the MRND government of Juvénal Habyarimana from 15 January 1989 to 4 February 1991, in the successive "multi-party" government formed on 31 December 1991, and the second "multi-party" government formed on 16 April 1992.  As of 1994, he was also MRND president for Gitarama prefecture.

The ICTR indictment against musician Simon Bikindi charges that Bikindi, an author of many racially charged anti-Tutsi songs, “consulted with President Juvénal Habyarimana, Minister of Youth and Sports Callixte Nzabonimana and MRND-aligned military authorities on song lyrics” before releasing them to be played on the Hutu Power radio station RTLM.

During the genocide 

After the death of Habyarimana on April 6, 1994, Nzabonimana was appointed Minister of Youth and Sports (Ministre du Sport et de la Jeunesse) in the interim government. Between April 9 and 14 July, he is alleged to have met with fellow ministers at a number of Government meetings in which ministers received briefings on the genocide's progress, and requested weapons to distribute in their home provinces for use by the genocidaires.

On 21 November 2001, the International Criminal Tribunal for Rwanda (ICTR) released an indictment charging Nzabonimana and others with genocide, conspiracy to commit genocide, complicity in genocide, direct and public incitement to commit genocide, and crimes against humanity.

Apprehension 
Nzabonimana was detained in Tanzania on February 18, 2008 and transferred to custody of the ICTR on February 19, 2008.

According to African Rights, Nzabonimana is one of the "three key civilians" collaborating with the FLDR, operating out of the Democratic Republic of the Congo.

References

Footnotes

Sources 

http://www.hrw.org/reports/1999/rwanda/Geno4-7-04.htm
Kamanzi, Rwanda, Du Génocide à la Defaite, p. 110; African Rights, Rwanda, Death, Despair, p. 361.

External links 
African Rights: Charge Sheet No. 1 March 1999
U.S. State Department press release about Nzabonimana
Profile on Trial Watch

Living people
People indicted by the International Criminal Tribunal for Rwanda
Planning ministers of Rwanda
Sports ministers of Rwanda
Youth ministers of Rwanda
1953 births